Charles Houël du Petit Pré (1616—22 April 1682) was a French governor of Guadeloupe from 1643 to 1664. He was also knight and lord.

He became, by a royal proclamation dated August 1645, the first of the island judicial officer. He is named Marquis de Guadeloupe by Louis XIV. On 4 September 1649, Charles Houël, who partnered with his brother in law John Boisseret Herblay, bought the bankrupt Compagnie Guadeloupe, Marie-Galante, La Désirade and Les Saintes for 60000 books pétun (tobacco) and was committed to deliver 600 pounds of sugar per year.

In order to secure the site and solidify its grip on the population, he built Fort Saint-Charles in 1650.

Despite the 1640 peace treaty between Indians and France, clashes with the Caribbean continued. On 31 March 1660, Charles Houël signed a treaty with the Caribbean, who abandoned the majority of the island to the French and retreated to the island of Dominica. However, a small number of Indians took refuge north and east of Grande-Terre (pointes de la Grande-Vigie et des Châteaux, Anse-Bertrand).

Charles Houël founded the town of Basse-Terre in 1649. He gave his name to Houëlmont, one of the highest mounts in the Caribbean.

Created by Colbert in August 1664, the French West India Company has to the monopoly for exploitation of sugar islands and main task the acquisition of the island of Guadeloupe to Houël to re-establish the royal authority.

Charles Houël was also Lord of Varennes, Lord of Petit-Pré, Knight and Baron Morainville.

Titles held

References

1616 births
1682 deaths
French colonial governors of Guadeloupe
French marquesses